Hablitzia tamnoides, or Caucasian spinach, the sole species in the genus Hablitzia, is an edible, herbaceous perennial plant, native to the Caucasus region. It is in the family Amaranthaceae, subfamily Betoideae, related to Beta, but unlike that genus, is a vine, climbing to 3 m or more tall in summer. Caucasian spinach is a long-lived herbaceous perennial climber. In fact it is one of the very few vines in its family (Kadereit et al. 2006) - as one source put it, Hablitzia 'is remarkable and altogether anomalous in the order to which it belongs by its tall climbing habit’. It is also likely one of the longest lived plants in its family - one plant growing in Norrtälje, Sweden is reported to be over 50 years old. It is a diploid (2n=2x=18) with a basic chromosome number of 9 (Darlington & Wylie, 1955, p. 76).

Description

Leaves and stems 
Caucasian spinach has green, heart-shaped (cordate) leaves, often slightly crimped, but without serration or lobing, which taper to a narrow point (acumiate), and sometimes have very soft, almost silky hairs on them. Hablitzia's leaf-surface is more or less matt, and the veins are arranged around a single, central axis. The stems are generally green, with noticeable ridges running their length and can be flushed red. The leaves are edible, similar to those of the related spinach.

Flowers 

Hablitzia flowers are individually quite small, a lighter green than the foliage, perhaps greenish-yellow, and like little five-pointed stars, a fact that is reflected in the Norwegian name, Stjernemelde, which means Star-chenopod (Barstow 2014). They are borne profusely in an  racemose, paniculate and/or thyrsoid arrangement. The flowers appear from late May through July. The flowers have a noteworthy quality, and that is their scent. Individually it isn't particularly pronounced. Even when flowers abound, you probably wouldn't notice it from any great distance. But if you draw close to a particularly floriferous Hablitzia, you might notice the air filled with scent almost exactly like crushed Coriander (Cilantro) leaf - rather unpleasant. What makes that interesting is that there is a story behind why some people have a strong aversion to Coriander - of a cluster of olfactory-receptor genes, one, called OR6A2, encodes a particular receptor that is highly sensitive to aldehyde chemicals such as those which contribute to the flavour of Coriander. Perhaps Hablitzia contains similar compounds to the unrelated umbellifer - if so OR6A2 may well play a role in our perception of Hablitzia flowers too. Flowers are hermaphrodite.

Seeds 
Hablitzia produces tiny, glossy black seeds, sometimes in abundance.

Roots 
In autumn, the aerial parts of both plants die back, but where the Tamus (or Dioscorea) retreats to a large, irregularly shaped subterranean tuber, Hablitzia almost always has its head either above the ground or very close to the surface. Even over winter, you can usually find, at the base of the old stems, a crown of more or less elongated buds or incipient shoots, which usually remain dormant until around February. Around the primary shoots, there are often many smaller, secondary buds ready to take over if the first flush is damaged (or eaten), which can be seen if you carefully remove the soil around the base of the plant. Occasionally the crowns seem to raise up out of the ground – or the surrounding soil washing away – exposing the thick, fleshy roots, which are somewhat like those of Sea Kale, and giving the dormant plant the appearance of an insane caudiciform.

Height 
Hablitzia plants can easily grow to a height of around three meters with adequate support. However, they don't have tendrils or suckers and their stems seem to be only very weakly twining, so they climb mostly by twisting their leaf stalks around the structures upon and through which they grow, as many Clematis species do. Where support is lacking,  they seem fairly happy sprawling almost horizontally across the ground or cascading down over the edges of the container, raised bed, or similar. Across their native range, they have even been observed hanging over the openings of caves.

Native range and growing conditions 

As its common name suggests Hablitzia hails from the Caucasus where it grows at altitudes up to around 2,100 masl. According to most reports it is most commonly found in dry, deciduous or mixed woods and forests, particularly in shady spots, amongst rocks, in ravines and along rivers. Where most Goosefoot family members prefer full sun, Caucasian spinach is - like its cousin, Good King Henry (Blitum bonus-henricus) - one of the few shade-loving species, a fact that is also reflected in its peculiar affinity for caves - in his 2009 article in Permaculture Activist, 'Food Exploration in the Caucasus: An Encounter with Wild Hablitza' Justin West, reports finding plants inhabiting the better part of half the floor of one cave in the mountains of Armenia.

As well as the Caucasus proper, Hablitzia has also been recorded in North-Eastern Turkey, where it has naturalized, as well as further East in Iran and West in Greece (Assadi 1983). And Stephen Barstow reports that there are also relic populations and individual plants scattered across Scandinavia (several in Sweden, Finland and at least one in Norway), a fact that reflects the curious history of Hablitzia.

History 
From its home in the Caucasus, Hablitzia seems to have begun its travels across Europe in the early 1800s. It was grown in the UK, at Kew and Cambridge Botanical Gardens, as early as 1828 (Barstow 2014) – only 11 years after Bieberstein first described it – and at Glasgow around ten years after that (Loudon 1840). Kew seem to have had plants on the go at least until 1931, the last year in which it appears in their Bulletin of Miscellaneous Information. The three British institutions seem to be among the first botanic gardens to grow Hablitzia, and it isn't until the second half of the 19th Century that references to its cultivation elsewhere starts appearing with any regularity.

Naming 
Hablitzia was first described and documented for the international scientific community, by Friedrich August Marschall von Bieberstein, in the Mémoires de la Société impériale des naturalistes de Moscou (t.5). It was Bieberstein, who gave it its botanical name. The generic epithet, Hablitzia, is a Latinized version of Hablitz, a reference to Carl Ludwig Hablitz, the 18th Century naturalist. Tamnoides means 'like', or 'resembling' Tamus communis.

Uses

Culinary 
Hablitzia leaves can be eaten raw or cooked. The young ones in particular are delicious, but even the older ones make for good eating - they do not develop any real bitterness once mature. However, the older leaves of plants grown in full sun, particularly if they have suffered drought stress, are generally better cooked.

In addition to the leaves, the young shoots, tender vine tips, and emerging inflorescence can be used as a vegetable, again raw or cooked. The shoots can be picked as they start into active growth, but are particularly good when harvested from the crown while still dormant/semi-dormant, as at this stage the undeveloped leaves are still tightly packed and folded upwards, so that they press close against the stem, adding up to a slightly more substantial vegetable, a bit like Asparagus. What's more, early in the season they are often the most remarkable magenta color. They can also be blanched a few weeks prior to harvesting, which may make them a little sweeter, but this is not by any means necessary to enjoy them, as whenever you pick them, they are delicious, even simply sauteed in butter, and dressed with a little lemon juice and salt and/or black pepper.

It is unknown if the seeds and roots are edible.

Nutritional information 
Until fairly recently there hasn't been much nutritional information available for Hablitzia. However, some work has been carried out at the University of Helsinki, Finland by Leena Nurmi, and in 2016 she shared some of the findings of her Master's Thesis, titled Köynnöspinaatti, written on Hablitzia, to the Friends of Hablitzia Facebook group. On analysis Hablitzia leaves were shown to contain high amounts of carotenoids, folates, calcium, magnesium, phosphorus and zinc. Its levels of several common limiting factors – oxalic acid, nitrate, cadmium and lead – were also found to be within permissible thresholds. Leena's study also looked at how Hablitzia's values compare to those of New Zealand Spinach (Tetragonia tetragonioides). Her findings were that, on a fresh weight basis, Caucasian spinach measured higher for carotenoids, folate, tocopherols, alpha-linolenic acid (an Omega-3 fatty acid), protein, sucrose and all other mineral and trace elements, except for manganese.

Other information is summarized by Hegnauer (1964), who reports the presence of the flavonoids Quercetin and Kaempferol, and the polyphenols, Caffeic acid, p-Coumaric acid and Ferulic acid in Hablitzia leaves (p. 413). They also report that the whole plant contains 1% (by dry weight) of the methylamine Betain, (citing Stanek and Domin (1909/1910) on p. 417).

Another noteworthy feature of Hablitzia is that, like beetroot, and other members of the Chenopodiaceae, it produces betacyanins, a class of compounds structurally related to alkaloids, rather than the more widely distributed anthocyanins – any red colouration seen in the stems and leaves is, therefore, due to these.

Ornamental 
Hablitzia is a beautiful, ornamental climbing vine with abundant, small white flowers and nicely shaped leaves.

Cultivation

Position in the garden 
Hablitzia can tolerate reasonable amounts of shade. In fact, plants have grown in full sun and partial shade, and the experience is that it shows, as Jules Rudolph wrote back in 1897, 'a marked preference' [un preference marquee] for the latter (p. 329). In particular, it seems to benefit from having its feet in the shade - presumably because this helps the soil to remain cool and retain more water during the hottest parts of the year. The plants themselves grow well enough in full sun but unless they get plenty of water, weeks of glaring summer sunshine eventually impacts on the quality of the leaves and shortens the window within which they are at their prime.

Cold hardiness 
Many of the plants in circulation come via Scandinavia, and are likely very cold-hardy - some survive in Finnmark, in the northernmost part of Norway, are known to withstand temperatures down to -30 (Barstow 2014). In its home in the Caucasus wild populations of Hablitzia occupy a number of habitats, some of these may grow at considerable altitude, and share the hardiness of the Nordic stock, but it is unlikely that they are all this hardy, even if they are relatively so.

Soil 
Caucasian spinach seems to tolerate a range of soils conditions. However, the conditions a plant can tolerate and those under which it flourishes are not necessarily the same, and while there is some truth to John Weather's claim that it ‘flourishes in ordinary garden soil’ (1911, p. 263), that really depends on what you imagine the soil in a typical garden to be like. He, at any rate, seems have regarded Hablitzia as having slightly more specific requirements a decade earlier when, in A Practical Guide to Garden Plants, he writes that it requires ‘a good, rich, loamy soil' (p.765). In agreement with this, a short entry from 1880 in the periodical The Garden attributes the unprecedented vigor of a plant in cultivation at Kew to its 'having been planted two years ago in a deep bed of loam and manure’ (Anon. 1880, p. 79).

Drainage 
Two factors that do seem to be important are drainage and pH. Although Hablitzia likes a good deal to drink when it first commences into growth, it seems to resent wet feet in winter. This seems to be well established as an entry from 1893 in The Gardener's Chronicle, urges readers to 'bear in mind the importance of dryness at the root during the winter' (Anon. 1893. p. 236). In his New Illustrated Encyclopedia of Gardening (1960), Thomas Everett reiterates this: 'stagnant moisture is fatal to the roots in winter' (p. 815).

pH 
As for pH, Hablitzia seems to have a preference for neutral or alkaline soil, which is not entirely surprising given that many members of the Chenopodiaceae thrive on soils with fairly high concentrations of alkali-salts (sodium chloride, sodium carbonate, gypsum). While it seems to do fine on weakly acidic soil (around pH 5), once your universal indicator starts to look like a glass of Chartreuse you're probably pushing up against its limits.

Climbing support 
Although not strictly necessary, most people prefer to provide Caucasian spinach with something to climb up or through. Any large trellis, garden obelisk, bean pole wigwam, or similar should work fine, and a number of older sources suggest using it to cover an arch or pergola. But perhaps the most satisfying way to provide Hablitzia with support is to use a living trellis. Placing it at the base of a tree, particularly a deciduous one, which will have an open canopy early in the year so that the emerging shoots have a little extra light, can work very well. In fact, The Garden recommend Hablitzia be 'placed at the base of a tree, so that the slender stems can cling to the trunk and develop its large head of feathery green blossoms' (Anon. 1881, p. 71). As well as trees, you might want to try large bushy shrubs.

Pests and diseases 
Hablitzia is not known to suffer from many pests or diseases, although it is a host plant for a species for Tortoise or Leaf-mining Beatle, Cassida seraphina var. hablitziae, native to Turkey and Kazakhstan. In one study it is reported that plants were successfully inoculated with the leaf spot virus Cercospora beticola. There is also some suggestion that warmer climates with high humidity, particularly during the hottest parts of the year, can cause the plants to sulk or worse, simply give up the ghost.

Propagation

From seeds 
Caucasian spinach can be grown from seed or propagated vegetative and both methods are fairly easy. Fresh seeds germinate readily and they do so more evenly and over a shorter period when sown outside, while temperatures are still relatively cool, e.g. in March and April. In general, no special pre-treatment is used, however some people find that a short period of cold-stratification can help. When sowing Hablitzia seeds,  scatter them onto the surface of a mixture of peat-free compost and sand and cover with a thin layer of horticultural grit.

Those who have grown plants from seed collected wild within its native range report that germination can be less reliably and occur somewhat irregularly over longer periods.

Hablitzia flowers are hermaphrodite and plants seems to be self-fertile. However, some plants may be more self-compatible than others, as some seem to find that plants only produce large amounts of seed if there are two or more genetically distinct plants growing close together. Mature Hablitzia's often self-seed freely - although the seedlings are vulnerable to slugs and snails. One question that haven't been answered definitively is how long Hablitzia seeds are likely to remain viable after they mature. However, a post to the Friends of Hablitzia Facebook group, reports success germinating seeds that were stored for around four years in less than ideal conditions.

Vegetative propagation 
When it comes to vegetative propagation of Hablitzia, there are a couple of options. One is to lift and divide established plants, as you would other clump-forming perennials. The best time to do this is once the current season's growth has died back or early the following season before they have started into active growth. Cuttings can also be successful. After removing shoots from the base of the plant with a small heal - just after they start into growth in early Spring - and cutting away the lowest leaves,  apply a small amount of liquid rooting hormone, and place them in sandy compost, in a cool, sheltered spot out of direct sunlight. Plants started from cuttings tend not to grow very strongly in their first year, but by the end of autumn 5 -10 buds should be visible at the base of plants ready to start into growth the following season. It is unsure whether Hablitzia can be propagated by root cuttings.

First year plants are quite slow growing, and for best long-term results it is recommended that you do not harvest from them heavily until their second year, when plants become much more vigorous.

References

Amaranthaceae
Amaranthaceae genera
Monotypic Caryophyllales genera
Leaf vegetables
Flora of the Caucasus